Dmitry Yakovlevich Popov (pseudonyms — D. Punimov and D. Ya. Podov, ; May 3, 1863, Vologda Governorate — October 9, 1921, Komi-Zyryan Autonomous Oblast) was a priest and revolutionary, who was expelled from the seminary because of his alcoholism. Later he became a head of a parochial school and a censor of translations from Komi language - he also wrote poems in this language. Popov was a deputy of the Fourth Imperial Duma from the Vologda Governorate between 1912 and 1917. During the February Revolution, he blessed revolutionary troops in front of Tauride Palace. After October 1917, he supported the bolsheviks, for which he was laicization of clergy. Later he became a member of the Komi-autonomist party and was accused of anti-Soviet activities.

Literature 
 Николаев А. Б. Попов Дмитрий Яковлевич (in Russian) // Государственная дума Российской империи: 1906—1917 / Б. Ю. Иванов, А. А. Комзолова, И. С. Ряховская. — Москва: РОССПЭН, 2008. — P. 482. — 735 p. — .
 Попов (in Russian) // Члены Государственной думы (портреты и биографии): Четвертый созыв, 1912—1917 г. / сост. М. М. Боиович. — Москва: Тип. Т-ва И. Д. Сытина, 1913. — P. 39. — LXIV, 454, [2] p. 
 Демин В. Дмитрий Яковлевич Попов, общественный деятель и поэт (in Russian) // Писатели Коми: Библиографический словарь. — Сыктывкар: Научная библиотека Республики Коми; Коми научный центр УрО РАН; Литературно-мемориальный музей И. Куратова, 2001. — Vol. 2. — P. 134. — 510 p. — .

1863 births
1921 deaths
People from the Komi Republic
People from Ust-Sysolsky Uyezd
Russian Eastern Orthodox priests
Progressive Party (Russia) politicians
Left socialist-revolutionaries
Members of the 4th State Duma of the Russian Empire